The 2018 Sunshine Ladies Tour was the 5th season of the Sunshine Ladies Tour, a series of professional golf tournaments for women based in  South Africa.

The season offered a purse of R4,450,000, plus a 100,000 incentive for the Investec Property Fund Order of Merit winner.

Schedule
The season consisted of 8 events, 7 in South Africa and one in Eswatini, played as a block between January and March, with one event in May.

Order of Merit
This shows the final Investec Property Fund Order of Merit, which featured a R100,000 bonus. The leader received a wild card for an event on the Ladies European Tour and Final Stage exemption into the 2019 LET Q-School.

Source:

References

External links
Official homepage of the Sunshine Ladies Tour

Sunshine Ladies Tour
Sunshine Ladies Tour